Uncyclopedia is a satirical online encyclopedia that parodies Wikipedia. Its logo, a hollow "puzzle potato", parodies Wikipedia's globe puzzle logo, and it styles itself "the content-free encyclopedia", parodying Wikipedia's slogan of "the free encyclopedia". Founded in 2005 as an English-language wiki, the project spans more than 75 languages as well as several subprojects parodying other wikis. The English version has approximately 37,000 pages of content, second only to the Portuguese. Uncyclopedia's name is a portmanteau of the prefix un- and the word encyclopedia.

Various styles of humor are used as a vehicle for parody, from pointed satire to light sarcasm, along with structured in-jokes and frequent non sequiturs. The site has attracted media attention for its articles on controversial subjects including religion, prominent people, places, politics, and pseudoscience.

Many Uncyclopedia articles contain graphics with a link to the corresponding Wikipedia article. A typical caption reads, "For those without comedic tastes, the so-called experts at Wikipedia have an article about [subject in question]." Some also have a link to the corresponding Conservapedia article. A typical caption for one of these is "The faux patriot snake handlers at Conservapedia have an even funnier article about [subject in question]." Some even have a link to the corresponding RationalWiki article. A typical caption for these is "The truth-debunking doctors at RationalWiki have an even funnier article about [subject in question]."

History

Uncyclopedia was launched on January 5, 2005, by Jonathan Huang, known online as "Chronarion", and a partner known online as "Stillwaters". It was originally situated at uncyclopedia.org. In July 2006 it was acquired by Fandom, then known as Wikia.

In January 2013, some Uncyclopedia editors and administrators set up a fork of Uncyclopedia at en.uncyclopedia.co, in response to Wikia's censorship, insertion of advertising, and the imposition of content warnings. Fandom ceased hosting its version of Uncyclopedia on May 14, 2019, and the Fandom site (colloquially known as the "spoon", a play on "fork") moved to uncyclopedia.ca, and in September 2021 to uncyclopedia.com. The Fandom version of the site now shows only a "Not a valid community" landing page.

A third site, at mirror.uncyc.org, functions only as a mirror website with backup copies of some Uncyclopedia pages.

Structure
Uncyclopedia is built on the same MediaWiki software that Wikipedia uses. However, during Fandom's (Wikia's) hosting of Uncyclopedia, Fandom extensively modified its version of MediaWiki version 1.19, making the Fandom Uncyclopedia site incompatible with later MediaWiki versions. In May 2018, Fandom dropped support for the Monobook skin that its Uncyclopedia site had used to mimic Wikipedia, claiming this was necessary to achieve GDPR compliance, and warned that local work-arounds could not be extended to new visitors and editors by default. Since all Uncyclopedias split off or were removed from Fandom, they mostly switched to using Vector instead (with MinervaNeue on mobile), in order to continue parodying Wikipedia.

Foreign-language Uncyclopedia-like projects are described below. Some of these are independent domains: In 2007, 58.8% (or 20 out of 34) of the Uncyclopedia collection was hosted by Wikia. Six dedicated non-Wikia servers host "Uncyclopedia Babel" content in various languages. To coordinate these projects (collectively, the "Uncyclomedia Babel Project") an Un-Meta wiki was created in 2006.

Uncyclopedia projects are run independently by their own members, though some users have accounts on multiple Uncyclopedias. They contain interlanguage links to each other, but there is no global governing organization comparable to the Wikimedia Foundation that oversees Wikipedia as well as its sister projects.

Content
Uncyclopedia's content is licensed under the Creative Commons Attribution-NonCommercial-ShareAlike 3.0 (CC BY-NC-SA 3.0) license, although some content, notably images, is copyrighted. Different Uncyclopedias sometimes have different licenses; for example, dÉsencyclopédie (French Uncyclopedia) is dual-licensed under CC BY-NC-SA 2.0 and the GFDL. As of March 2022, the English-language Uncyclopedia contains approximately 36,800 articles.

Articles

Uncyclopedia encourages satire that is close to or resembles the truth. However, many articles employ absurdist humor and little, if any, factual accuracy remains. For example, Uncyclopedia's article about Wikipedia claims that Wikipedia is a parody of Uncyclopedia, not the reverse. Many articles on the site contradict each other, even articles on the same subject.

Like Wikipedia's "Five pillars", Uncyclopedia has "Five pliers", including "Satirical point of view". Its code of conduct follows from three main rules: "Be funny and not just stupid", "Don't be a dick", and "Dance like you've never danced before!"

Parodying Wikipedia's article review service peer review, Uncyclopedia has a "Pee Review" where authors seek review by other Uncyclopedians on humor, grammar, spelling, use of images, and overall presentation. Users can post to other wiki pages to solicit coding help and review or request user-edited images. Like Wikipedia, Uncyclopedia features articles and images on its front page. A system of user voting decides which articles and images to feature, usually deciding based on humour and writing quality. The site also welcomes audio contributions such as narration of articles.
Uncyclopedia's articles often begin with quotations, usually misquoted, fictitiously attributed or entirely fabricated. Among the most recurrent themes is the invention of quotes attributed to Oscar Wilde, prompted by an article stating that inventing Wilde quotes was the "national sport of England", and themes such as "kitten huffing" (the inhalation of the souls of cats as a form of drug abuse).

Much like Wikipedia, Uncyclopedia has policies concerning vanity articles, which are articles written by an individual associated with the subject of the page. Vanity articles were disallowed after many of them produced flame wars. Uncyclopedia does not police conflict of interest but may delete submissions as non-notable on a case-by-case basis, using an AfD-like system called "Votes for deletion" (VfD) and a CSD-like system called "QuickVFD".

One of Uncyclopedia's most popular articles, "AAAAAAAAA", is a nonsensical page, with its content completely consisting of the upper case letter A with images and some punctuation marks.

Site-wide pranks

Some jokes involve the entire website, sometimes including a re-skin of the main page, such as with holiday themes. In 2012, as a parody of Wikipedia's black-out protest against the Stop Online Piracy Act (SOPA) et al., Uncyclopedia blocked all content for a day with a notice claiming to support the bills. A tradition of April Fool's Day front page pranks occurs on the wiki, including a "blood donation" plea banner to spoof wiki donation banners on April 1, 2014. For one week in 2013, the Wikia fork interrupted viewing with a claim that the site was unavailable, spoofing a notice on the NASA website during the United States federal government shutdown of 2013.

Traditions
Each year, Uncyclopedia writers create a list of 100worst reflections of that year, marking website milestones or simply news. Most years, the creators of the list reveal that they have once again put off the list until the last second, and simply skip a large chunk to get to a hundred in time. Other Uncyclopedia traditions include creating a "top10" list of articles for each year, chosen by popular vote.

Subprojects

As well as housing many articles designed to satirize Wikipedia-style content, Uncyclopedia contains several secondary projects (known as "UnProjects"). As of 2017, there were sixteen such subprojects, each of which specializes in parody of a different information style. Many of these are directly analogous to Wikipedia's sister projects, while others such as UnTunes and HowTo parody projects completely unrelated to Wikipedia.

Press coverage
Uncyclopedia has been referenced in several well-known news publications from around the world, in addition to numerous local and regional newspapers and periodicals. In 2005 the Flying Spaghetti Monster entry from Uncyclopedia was mentioned in a New York Times column reporting the spread of "Pastafarianism", the religion that worships the Flying Spaghetti Monster. The column was then reprinted in other newspapers, including the Taipei Times. The magazine .net featured an interview with Huang about Uncyclopedia in May 2007. A number of other articles have been centred on specific entries on Uncyclopediamost notably the article in the Arizona Daily Star, which focused on the Tucson, Arizona parody, and the article in the Cyprus Mail, which focused on the Cyprus article.

In addition to articles about specific entries on the wiki, several papers speak of the website in generalusually in a section devoted to technology or the Internet. This was the case when Uncyclopedia was referenced in the Boston Herald and The Guardian. Although most articles mentioning Uncyclopedia are specific to the site, there are other articles about Wikia or Wikipedia that just mention its name briefly. These include the editorial in The Register discussing the Seigenthaler incident, in which Uncyclopedia was named only once. It has also been listed as one of the "Top 100 Undiscovered Web Sites" in PC Magazine, as well as among the "101 most useful websites" on the internet by The Sunday Telegraph. Seattle Post-Intelligencer considers Uncyclopedia to be the wiki site equivalent of The Onion.

Criticism and controversy

At various times, articles on Uncyclopedia have been subject to criticism from King's College (School, Auckland) the North-West Evening Mail, Northern Irish politician James McCarry, civic leaders of Telford, Shropshire, UK, the Sioux City Journal, Hawke's Bay Today, and Lochaber News.

In January 2008 the Malaysian Internal Security Ministry issued a directive alerting newspaper editors not to trust Uncyclopedia. It said the article concerning Malaysia contained "untruths, insults and ridicule" and was demeaning to the country.

The site uses a layout that looks similar to Wikipedia's, which may confuse inexperienced users who misinterpret the content as factual.

In November 2012 the page "HowTo:Commit suicide" on the Russian-language Uncyclopedia: Absurdopedia; was legally prohibited by the Russian Federal Service for Supervision of Consumer Rights Protection and Human Welfare (Rospotrebnadzor). Absurdopedia administrator Edward Chernenko unsuccessfully sued them under his right to science and culture guaranteed by the Russian Constitution. During the proceedings, the Russian government and its experts claimed that Absurdopedia is intentionally trying to increase the number of child suicides in Russia by providing children with instructions for killing themselves. , the case is currently in the ECHR.

In 2014 the page "HowTo:Make a bomb at home" on Absurdopedia was included in the Russian list of extremist materials.

In 2017 two pages of Absurdopedia were banned in Russia: "HowTo:Bathe a cat" for "calls to violence against animals" and "HowTo:Make a nuclear bomb" for "information on manufacturing weapons".

In August 2014 the logo displayed for Greggs on its Google profile was mistakenly temporarily switched to the logo used on Uncyclopedia's article on the subject at the Wikia site due to a caching issue, causing a PR crisis for the company.

In other languages
The Uncyclopedia concept has been adapted to wikis in more than fifty other languages. The UnNews project has similarly been replicated, under various localised names, in eighteen other languages. The websites also invoke various parody languages such as "Portuñol" and "English But Louder". The first Uncyclopedias in languages other than English were created in June 2005, beginning with a French-language version. On February 20, 2008, the 50th language, Welsh, was added to the Uncyclopedia series.

Each language wiki is free to establish its own unique community identity, but most of the logos and names in use retain some semblance to those of the English-language version. For instance, as an "un-" encyclopedia, the encyclopedia is named "Uncyclopedia" in both English and German.

Some of the largest Uncyclopedias available in other languages are listed below.

Danish – Spademanns Leksikon
Spademanns Leksikon was established in 2006 by the user Lhademmor. The name lacks the "pedia" of most Uncyclopedias, and the website does not use the jigsaw-potato logo but resembles the logo of the largest newspaper in Denmark, Ekstrabladet.

In 2012 the website contained more than six thousand articles. Together with the Norwegian Ikkepedia, it accuses Swedes of having no sense of humor because of their poor Uncyclopedia. Website memes include use of Chuck Norris as a cult hero; writing in the style of Hans Christian Andersen, here claimed to be homosexual; and fictitious characters Omboo Hankvald, Hermod Spademann, Gubernichte Hankvald (Omboo's mother) and Troels Hartmann. Their image of God is very close to Barry White.

Dutch – Oncyclopedia
The Dutch version started in June 2006. Within half a year the number of articles grew to about 350. Though the number of pages in March 2007 was around 500, 150 short articles moved to the new daughter project, the "OnWoordenboek der Nederlandse Taal" (literally, "UnDictionary of the Dutch Language"), almost doubling the number of new contributions. In February 2007, a second project started: OnNieuws (UnNews), a newspaper full of nonsense. This can be either fictional news or real news told in a funny way. Around March 15, 2007, the decision was made to change the name. The Onziclopedie was renamed to Oncyclopedia (Neerlandica). Later more projects started: OnZinnen (Unquotable), OnBoeken (UnBooks)
and the Oncycloversiteit (Uncycloversity).
Oncyclopedia also has its own fictional radio station (OnRadio),
which is available only on the weblog of Oncyclopedia. The Oncy has become well known mostly because of the articles about emo, Tokio Hotel, and suicide. These articles have gotten a lot of criticism in the past, but the admins mostly did not do anything with it, because as they say, it is mostly destructive commentary. Sometimes blocks follow, although this happens only in the case of swearing. At the end of May 2011, the Oncyclopedia had more than 2,150 articles.

Finally there is the "Oncyclopolis Project". This gives the Oncyclopedia a fictional city-state, Oncyclopolis and its own ranking system (based on number of articles, user rights and user duty) comparable with the system of the Uncyclopedia.

Finnish – Hikipedia
Hikipedia (from Finnish hiki "sweat" and encyclopedia, a parody of the name "Wikipedia") is a Finnish-language nonsense wiki founded in April 2005. Hikipedia was originally intended as an independent nonsense wiki and was added to the Uncyclopedia project only later. In 2011 Hikipedia had more than seven thousand articles and over thirty-eight thousand pages.

French – Désencyclopédie
The Désencyclopédie was set up on June 30, 2005, by Quebec bloggers. The administration gradually abandoned the site before it was taken over by French-speaking volunteers around 2007.
On April 20, 2019, Fandom (ex-Wikia) closed access to the Désencyclopédie in French. The articles which are not in opposition to the conditions of use of Fandom can, however, always be consulted on another site where they are lodged and can still be edited.

German – Stupidedia

Stupidedia (from stupid and encyclopedia) is an Austrian wiki featuring satirically themed articles. It was created on December 17, 2004, by David Sowka, making it the first known humor wiki. In 2010 it joined the Uncyclopedia family, becoming one of the site's German-language wikis. Stupidedia is the largest German-language wiki of this kind with more than 22,412 articles . Its slogan is "Wissen Sie Bescheid? Nein? Wir auch nicht!" (English: Do you know the score? No? Neither do we!)

Greek – Frikipaideia
Frikipaideia (from φρίκη + εγκυκλοπαίδεια, read Frikipedia) is the Greek version of Uncyclopedia. It was created on 28 February 2006 with the title Ανεγκυκλοπαίδεια (the Greek variant of the name Uncyclopedia) from a proposal by Greek Wikipedians led by the user Dada, who is still an admin of the Greek Wikipedia. After a proposal it was renamed on 20 September 2006 to Frikipaideia. Today it has more than 3,200 articles and 2,083 registered users (as of 26 December 2021), while in the past it was stating more than eleven million registered users, although it was hundred times larger than in reality. It was most active in the period 2006 to 2010, although it retained significant activity until 2019, when the transfer of Uncyclopedia wikis to independent sites took place. After 2019 there was a period of large inactivity that lasted for some months, but since 2020 Frikipaideia is fairly active, thanks to a new generation of contributors. It has subprojects as well, including the Frikivivlia and Frikinea (the Greek counterparts to UnBooks and UnNews).

Italian – Nonciclopedia
Nonciclopedia, the Italian-language version, was founded on November 3, 2005, and features more than 14,000 articles. Like Uncyclopedia, it has many secondary projects, like Manuali, a collection of fake or humorous tutorials about strange arguments (like How to conquer England in 4 steps), the Horroscopo, a fake horoscope, NonNotizie, a parody of Wikinews, and the Walk of Shame, a parody of the "Walk of Fame", which collects the best articles. Like most of the other languages' editions, there is a space for the Article of the Week, and some pages have related audio files containing a vocal narration of the page's content. Typical subjects of humour are Wikipedia, Chuck Norris, Pier Paolo Pasolini, Silvio Berlusconi, emo subculture, Nietzsche, Germano Mosconi, the fictional state of Svervegia (literally Swederway), and people who vandalize Nonciclopedia in response to being offended by an article. Since Chuck Norris, Svervegia, and emo topics were abused, especially by newbie writers, they are not used anymore, if not on very rare occasions. In October 2011 Nonciclopedia was closed for a short while by the administrators after legal threats were issued by Vasco Rossi. This has generated a strong protest movement on Facebook and other social networks.

Japanese – Ansaikuropedia
Uncyclopedia, fourth-largest with just over ten thousand pages, takes its name from the katakana transliteration of the word Uncyclopedia. It was founded in December 2005. Its "UnNews" section is known for posting stories that closely resemble real news stories, which has caused rumors and angry reactions on Twitter.

Polish – Nonsensopedia
Nonsensopedia is a Polish project that was initially just a Polish version of Uncyclopedia, but has since diverged from other projects in the family. It was founded on September 14, 2005 and has since grown to over 17,000 pages. It was hosted on Wikicities (later Wikia), but has since moved to an independent host on nonsa.pl in March 2019. Contrary to other Uncyclopedias, it puts a larger focus on following copyright law and actively encourages users to upload only free content.

Portuguese – Desciclopédia
Desciclopédia, the Portuguese-language version with more than 60,000 pages, is the largest Uncyclopedia. Founded in August 2005, it purports to be the brainchild of the largely fictional Doutor Roberto (Portuguese for "Doctor Robert") a satire upon the late powerful owner of TV Globo, Roberto Marinho. This humour routinely targets regional Brazilian notables such as centenarian comedy actress Dercy Gonçalves, depicted as a cover model posed for a Playboy-like magazine Playold. Actress Cláudia Raia is portrayed as a stingray. Political leaders such as Luiz Inácio Lula da Silva ("squid") also often fall victim to Desciclopédia's parodies, along with singers, athletes and other public figures.

Desciclopédia uses various domain hacks for individual secondary projects, which include Desnotícias ("notícias" is "news"), Descionário (with "dicionário" meaning "dictionary"), Deslivros (for books, "biblioteca" means "library"), and Desentrevistas ("entrevistas" meaning "interviews"). In English these would correspond to "UnNews", "UnDictionary", "UnBooks", and the exclusive-to-Desciclopédia "UnInterviews".

Russian – Absurdopedia
The Russian-language Uncyclopedia, Absurdopedia, was originally hosted by Wikia at absurdopedia.wikia.com on February 24, 2006. In October 2010 a fork site was established at absurdopedia.net In March 2019 the original Absurdopedia moved to the address absurdopedia.wiki as the "Olbanian" version of the project.

Spanish – Inciclopedia
The Spanish-language Inciclopedia was established in February 2006 to accommodate content displaced by the closure of Spanish humour wiki Frikipedia. Frikipedia was shut down after being sued by the Sociedad General de Autores y Editores, a Spanish organization for copyright who were angered by Frikipedia's entry on them. Frikipedia was eventually relaunched.

Notables such as Chilean folk singer El Monteaguilino and Senator Pedro Muñoz have expressed their discontent with Inciclopedia and the site's mockery of the Chilean flag and other national symbols. Noche Hache, a television program on Spain's TV Cuatro, also mentioned Inciclopedia among supporters of Eva Hache's joke candidacy to the presidency of Spain.

Czech – Necyklopedie
In January 2005 an article in Czech, dedicated to Ross Hedvíček, was published on Uncyclopedia. Necyklopedie by itself was launched a few months later in August. It experienced a huge growth as it reached fourteen thousand articles the very next month, and more than twenty-three thousand by August 2007. In September 2015 Necyklopedie consisted of more than thirty thousand, making it the second-largest Uncyclopedia at the time. However, that number greatly decreased during 2016 as the admins deleted all the poorly written articles.

Necyklopedie claims to be founded by Jára Cimrman.

Other
Hebrew: איןציקלופדיה (phonetic: eincyclopedia, the “ein” in the name is a play on a common typo in Hebrew, in which the letter Yud (י) is added to the word אנציקלופדיה)
Chinese:
Traditional Chinese: 偽基百科; Zhuyin: ㄨㄟˇ　ㄐㄧ　ㄅㄞˇ　ㄎㄜ.
Simplified Chinese: 伪基百科; pinyin: weǐ jī baǐ kē.
Esperanto: Neciklopedio.
German: Kamelopedia.
Ukrainian: Інциклопедія.
Tagalog: Pekepedia.
Indonesian: Tolololpedia.
Malaysian: Bodohpedia.
Swedish: Psyklopedin.
Thai: Uncyclopedia is translated into Thai as ไร้สาระนุกรม, a play on the words encyclopedia (สารานุกรม) and nonsense (ไร้สาระ). It refers to Wikipedia as Wigrianpedia, which is a play on Wikipedia (วิกิพีเดีย) and trolling (เกรียน).
Korean: 백괴사전
Norwegian: Ikkepedia.
Turkish: Yansiklopedi.

See also

Bigipedia
Dickipedia
Encyclopedia Dramatica

References

External links

Uncyclopedia "Fork"
Uncyclopedia "Spoon"
Uncyclopedia "Mirror"

American comedy websites
Internet properties established in 2005
Parodies of Wikipedia
Satirical websites
Wiki communities
Wikis